Butyriboletus roseogriseus is a pored mushroom  in the family Boletaceae found in Europe. It was originally described as a species of Boletus in 2014, but transferred later that year to the newly created genus Butyriboletus.

References

External links

roseogriseus
Fungi described in 2014
Fungi of Europe